Verkhny Fiagdon or Upper Fiagdon (Wællag Fijjagdon) is a settlement in Alagirsky District of North Ossetia–Alania (Russia). Verkhny Fiagdon is located in Kurtat valley on the river Fiagdon.

References

Rural localities in North Ossetia–Alania